Newfields is a village in Saint Philip Parish, Antigua and Barbuda.

Climate

Demographics

References 

Populated places in Antigua and Barbuda
Saint Philip Parish, Antigua and Barbuda